Boulay is a surname, and may refer to:

 Antoine Jacques Claude Joseph, comte Boulay de la Meurthe (1761–1840), French politician and magistrate
 Diana Boulay (born 1946), Canadian artist
 Étienne Boulay (born 1983), Canadian footballer
 Francine Boulay-Parizeau (born 1953), former Canadian handball player
 Herménégilde Boulay (1861–1942), Canadian politician, farmer, manufacturer, merchant and trader
 Isabelle Boulay (born 1972), francophone Canadian pop singer
 Joséphine Boulay (1869–1925), French organist and composer
 Mathieu Boulay (born 1987), Canadian footballer
 Olivier Boulay (born 1957), French automobile designer
Jean-Luc Boulay (born 1955), French and Canadian chef, restaurateur, Officer of the Ordre du Mérite Agricole de France, television personality in Quebec.

See also
 Du Boulay
 Boulay-les-Barres, Loiret, France
 Boulay-les-Ifs, Mayenne, France
 Boulay-Moselle, France, which gave its name to the Fortified Sector of Boulay
 Île Boulay, island near Abidjan, Côte d'Ivoire
 Le Boulay, Indre–et-Loire, France
 Le Boulay-Morin, Eure, France

References